Messier 83 or M83, also known as the Southern Pinwheel Galaxy and NGC 5236, is a barred spiral galaxy approximately 15 million light-years away in the constellation borders of Hydra and Centaurus. Nicolas-Louis de Lacaille discovered M83 on 23 February 1752 at the Cape of Good Hope. Charles Messier added it to his catalogue of nebulous objects (now known as the Messier Catalogue) in March 1781. It is one of the closest and brightest barred spiral galaxies in the sky, and is visible with binoculars. Its nickname of the Southern Pinwheel derives from its resemblance to the Pinwheel Galaxy (M101).

Characteristics 
M83 is a massive, grand design spiral galaxy. Its morphological classification in the De Vaucouleurs system is SAB(s)c, where the 'SAB' denotes a weak-barred spiral, '(s)' indicates a pure spiral structure with no ring, and 'c' means the spiral arms are loosely wound. The peculiar dwarf galaxy NGC 5253 lies near M83, and the two likely interacted within the last billion years resulting in starburst activity in their central regions.

The star formation rate in M83 is higher along the leading edge of the spiral arms, as predicted by density wave theory. NASA's Galaxy Evolution Explorer project on 16 April 2008 reported finding large numbers of new stars in the outer reaches of the galaxy— from the center. It had hitherto been thought that these areas lacked the materials necessary for star formation.

Supernovae 
Six supernovae have been observed in M83: SN 1923A, SN 1945B, SN 1950B, SN 1957D, SN 1968L and SN 1983N.

Environment 
M83 is at the center of one of two subgroups within the Centaurus A/M83 Group, a nearby galaxy group. Centaurus A is at the center of the other subgroup. These are sometimes identified as one group, and sometimes as two. However, the galaxies around Centaurus A and the galaxies around M83 are physically close to each other, and both subgroups appear not to be moving relative to each other.

See also
 List of Messier objects
 M83 (band), the band named after the galaxy

References

External links 

 
 ESO Photo Release eso0136, An Infrared Portrait of the Barred Spiral Galaxy Messier 83
 M83, SEDS Messier pages
 Spiral Galaxy Messier 83 at the astro-photography site of Takayuki Yoshida
 M83 The Southern Pinwheel
 X-rays Discovered From Young Supernova Remnant (SN 1957D)
 
 Messier 83 (Southern Pinwheel Galaxy) at Constellation Guide

Intermediate spiral galaxies
Starburst galaxies
Centaurus A/M83 Group
Hydra (constellation)
083
NGC objects
48082
17520223
UGCA objects